Los Ángeles is a town in the South Caribbean Coast Autonomous Region of Nicaragua.

South Caribbean Coast Autonomous Region